Fergus Kenrick Anderson (9 February 1909 – 6 May 1956) was a British professional motorcycle racer. He was a two-time Grand Prix World Champion. His name appears on the Nazis' "most wanted" list drawn up prior to their intended invasion of Britain (published online as "Hitler's Black Book" by Forces War Records).

Anderson was one of the first riders from Great Britain to make his living racing motorcycles on the European continent. In 1950 he signed with Moto Guzzi and competed in the 250 cc class. He convinced Moto Guzzi to build a 350 cc bike, initially of 320 cc but later a full 350. He raced to the 1953 world championship in the bike's first year of competition. Anderson became the oldest competitor in FIM history to win a Grand Prix race when, he won the 1953 Spanish Grand Prix at the age of 44 years and 273 days. He repeated this feat as 350 cc champion again in 1954. His 350 cc world championship wins were the first by a non-British bike.

He retired from racing to become Moto Guzzi's team manager, but quit over a dispute over having a freer hand at running the team. He returned to racing and was offered a ride by the BMW factory. He died in 1956 after being thrown from his bike at a race in Floreffe, Belgium.

Motorcycle Grand Prix results
1949 point system

Points system from 1950 to 1968

5 best results were counted up until 1955.

(key) (Races in italics indicate fastest lap)

References

1909 births
1956 deaths
People from Croydon
500cc World Championship riders
350cc World Championship riders
250cc World Championship riders
Isle of Man TT riders
Motorcycle racers who died while racing
Scottish Formula One drivers
Scottish motorcycle racers
Sport deaths in Belgium
350cc World Riders' Champions